The Susquehanna Group is a geologic group in Pennsylvania. It preserves fossils dating back to the Devonian period.

See also

 List of fossiliferous stratigraphic units in Pennsylvania
 Paleontology in Pennsylvania

References
 

Geologic groups of Pennsylvania